is a Japanese football manager and former player.

Early life
Imai was born in Saitama Prefecture on 29 December 1954 and graduated from Waseda University.

Playing career
Imai played for Fujitsu (later Kawasaki Frontale) from 1977 to 1981.

Coaching career
After retirement, Imai became a manager for Tokyo Gas in 1993. He managed Shiroki FC Serena (1996), Kawasaki Frontale (2000).

In November 2005, Imai was appointed by Japan Football Association to coach Chinese Taipei national team and to help the football development in Taiwan. It was his first international assignment. He accepted the challenge and signed a one-year contract with Chinese Taipei Football Association in December. Under his guidance, although the team did not have any amazing performance in international competitions, it was believed that Imai did bring good influence on the team, as well as football activities in Taiwan.

On 15 December 2006, Imai extended his contract with CTFA. In addition to men's national team, he also led Chinese Taipei women's national team in the 2008 Olympic Games qualification in February 2007. In 2008, he returned to Japan and became the manager of Waseda University.

In 2016, Imai became manager of Chinese Taipei again, but was fired in October of that year after complaints of team disunity. By January 2017, he was already mentoring Global Cebu which is set to participate at the Philippines Football League as its head coach.

In 2020, Imai briefly coached Taiwan Football Premier League team Taichung Futuro.

Managerial statistics

References

External links

1954 births
Living people
Waseda University alumni
Association football people from Saitama Prefecture
Japanese footballers
Kawasaki Frontale players
Japan Soccer League players
Japanese football managers
FC Tokyo managers
Kawasaki Frontale managers
Chinese Taipei national football team managers
Chinese Taipei women's national football team managers
Mongolia national football team managers
Global Makati F.C. managers
J1 League managers
Philippines Football League head coaches
Japanese expatriate football managers
Japanese expatriate sportspeople in Taiwan
Japanese expatriate sportspeople in Mongolia
Japanese expatriate sportspeople in the Philippines
Expatriate football managers in Taiwan
Expatriate football managers in Mongolia
Expatriate football managers in the Philippines
Association footballers not categorized by position